Sally Blane (born Elizabeth Jane Young; July 11, 1910 – August 27, 1997) was an American actress who appeared in more than 100 movies.

Early life
Blane was born in Salida, Colorado. She was the sister of actresses Polly Ann Young and Loretta Young, and the half-sister of Georgiana Young, who was the wife of Mexican actor Ricardo Montalbán.

Career
Blane had her film debut at the age of seven when she appeared in Sirens of the Sea in 1917. She returned to the film business as an adult in the 1920s, playing small parts in a number of silent films. Her career continued into the 1930s when Blane appeared in several low-budget films, including Once a Sinner (1930), A Dangerous Affair (1930), Arabian Knights (1931), Annabelle's Affairs (1931), Hello Everybody! (1933), City Limits (1934), Against the Law (1934), The Silver Streak (1934), and This is the Life (1935). Some of her scenes, including one in Annabelle's Affairs, in which she appeared in skimpy lingerie with Jeanette MacDonald and Joyce Compton, were risqué for their day, pre-dating the industry's Hays Code that largely forbade such shots after 1934. The footage from Annabelle's Affairs is considered lost.

Although her appearances began to fade toward the late 1930s, Blane acted in more than 100 films. She appeared onscreen at one time or another with all her sisters, for example with all three in The Story of Alexander Graham Bell (1939). After this, Blane appeared in only four more films in small supporting roles: Fighting Mad (1939), Charlie Chan at Treasure Island (1939), La Fuga, (1944) and A Bullet for Joey (1955).

Personal life
Blane, at one time romantically linked to singer Russ Columbo, married actor and director Norman Foster in October 1935. In June 1936, they had their first child, Gretchen, named after Blane's sister Loretta Young, whose birth name was Gretchen. They later had a son named Robert. Blane was Catholic and was educated in convent school.

Death
Blane died at her home near Beverly Hills, California, on August 27, 1997, of cancer (as did her sisters Polly, who died seven months prior, and Loretta, who died in 2000) at the age of 87.

Blane is buried next to her husband (Section W, tier 19, grave 21) in Culver City's Holy Cross Cemetery.

Selected filmography

Sirens of the Sea (1917) - Child
 The Sheik (1921) - Arab Child (uncredited)
 Casey at the Bat (1927) - Floradora Girl
 Rolled Stockings (1927) - (uncredited)
 Shootin' Irons (1927) - Lucy Blake
 Wife Savers (1928) - Colette
 Dead Man's Curve (1928) - Ethel Hume
 Her Summer Hero (1928) - Grave
 Horseman of the Plains (1928) - Dawn O'Day
 Fools for Luck (1928) - Louise Hunter
 The Vanishing Pioneer (1928) - June Shelby
 King Cowboy (1928) - Polly Randall
 Outlawed (1929) - Anne
 Wolves of the City (1929) - Helen Marsh
 Eyes of the Underworld (1929) - Florence Hueston
 The Very Idea (1929) - Nora
 Half Marriage (1929) - Sally
 Tanned Legs (1929) - Janet Reynolds
 The Show of Shows (1929) - Performer in 'Meet My Sister' Number
 The Vagabond Lover (1929) - Jean Whitehall
 The Little Accident (1930) - Madge
 Once a Sinner (1931) - Hope Patterson
 Ten Cents a Dance (1931) - Molly
 Women Men Marry (1931) - Rose Bradley
 Annabelle's Affairs (1931) - Dora
 The Star Witness (1931) - Sue Leeds
 Shanghaied Love (1931) - Mary Swope
 A Dangerous Affair (1931) - Marjory Randolph
 The Spirit of Notre Dame (1931) - Peggy
 X Marks the Spot (1931) - Sue Taylor
 Good Sport (1931) - Marge
 Law of the Sea (1931) - Betty Merton
 The Local Bad Man (1932) - Marion Meade
 Cross-Examination (1932) - Grace Varney
 The Reckoning (1932) - Judy
 Probation (1932) - Janet
 Disorderly Conduct (1932) - Helen Burke
 Escapade (1932) - Kay Whitney
 Forbidden Company (1932) - Barbara Blake
 The Phantom Express (1932) - Carolyn Nolan
 Heritage of the Desert (1932) - Judy
 The Pride of the Legion (1932) - Peggy Smith
 I Am a Fugitive from a Chain Gang (1932) - Alice
 Wild Horse Mesa (1932) - Sandy Melberne
 Hello, Everybody! (1933) - Lily Smith
 Trick for Trick (1933) - Constance Russell
 Night of Terror (1933) - Mary Rinehart
 Mayfair Girl (1933) - Brenda Mason
 Crime on the Hill (1933) - Sylvia Kennett
 Advice to the Lovelorn (1933) - Louise
 No More Women (1934) - Helen Young
 Stolen Sweets (1934) - Patricia Belmont
 City Limits (1934) - Helen Matthews
 City Park (1934) - Rose Wentworth
 Half a Sinner (1934) - Phyllis
 She Had to Choose (1934) - Clara Berry
 The Silver Streak (1934) - Ruth Dexter
 This Is the Life (1935) - Helen Davis
 The Great Hospital Mystery (1937) - Ann Smith
 Angel's Holiday (1937) - Pauline Kaye
 One Mile from Heaven (1937) - Barbara Harrison
 Crashing Through Danger (1938) - Ann Foster
 Numbered Woman (1938) - Linda Morgan
 The Story of Alexander Graham Bell (1939) - Gertrude Hubbard
 Way Down South (1939) - Claire Bouton
 Charlie Chan at Treasure Island (1939) - Stella Essex
 Fighting Mad (1939) - Ann Fenwick
 The Escape (1944) - Mrs. Garland
 A Bullet for Joey (1955) - Marie Temblay

References

External links

Sally Blane at Virtual History

1910 births
1997 deaths
20th-century American actresses
American child actresses
American film actresses
American silent film actresses
American television actresses
American Roman Catholics
Burials at Holy Cross Cemetery, Culver City
Deaths from cancer in California
Actresses from Palm Springs, California
Actresses from Salt Lake City
People from Salida, Colorado
WAMPAS Baby Stars
Catholics from Colorado
Catholics from California